MR2 or MR-2 may refer to:
 Toyota MR2, a sports car
 MegaRace 2, a 1996 video game
 Mercury-Redstone 2, an American space mission
 Monster Rancher 2, a 1999 video game
 Nimrod MR2, a military aircraft